Parma is a railway station serving the city of Parma, in the region of Emilia-Romagna, northern Italy. The station opened in 1859 and is located on the Milan–Bologna railway, Pontremolese railway (to La Spezia), Brescia–Parma railway and Parma–Suzzara railway. The train services are operated by Trenitalia, Trenord and Ferrovie Emilia Romagna.

The station is currently managed by Rete Ferroviaria Italiana (RFI). However, the commercial area of the passenger building is managed by Centostazioni. Each of these companies is a subsidiary of Ferrovie dello Stato (FS), Italy's state-owned rail company.

Location
Parma railway station is situated at Piazzale Carlo Alberto dalla Chiesa, at the northern edge of the city centre.

History
The station was inaugurated on 21 July 1859 together with the extension from Piacenza. It was rebuilt to the design of the Spanish architect Oriol Bohigas between 2007 and 2014.

Features
The passenger building is composed of a large central section and two smaller side buildings, connected by corridors.  Inside are the ticket office, waiting room and other public facilities, as well as the headquarters of the railway police and the traffic management department. The upper floor is used by Trenitalia.

The station yard has eight tracks used for passenger services.  They are served by a total of four platforms, which are equipped with shelters and connected via a pedestrian underpass.  The station yard also has a locomotive shed and a turntable.

A short distance from the station, along the line towards Milan, is a goods yard, which is still in use.

Train services
The station is served by the following service(s):

High speed services (Frecciarossa) Milan - Parma - Bologna - Florence - Rome
High speed services (Frecciabianca) Milan - Parma - Bologna - Ancona - Pescara - Foggia - Bari - Brindisi - Lecce
High speed services (Frecciabianca) Milan - Parma - Bologna - Ancona - Pescara - Foggia - Bari - Taranto
High speed services (Frecciabianca) Turin - Parma - Bologna - Ancona - Pescara - Foggia - Bari - Brindisi - Lecce
Intercity services Milan - Parma - Bologna - Florence - Rome - Naples - Salerno - Lamezia Termi - Reggio Calabria
Intercity services Milan - Parma - Bologna - Rimini - Ancona - Pescara - Foggia - Bari - Brindisi - Lecce
Intercity services Milan - Parma - Bologna - Rimini - Ancona - Pescara - Foggia - Bari - Taranto
Night train (Intercity Notte) Turin - Milan - Parma - Reggio Emilia - Florence - Rome - Salerno - Lamezia Terme - Reggio di Calabria
Night train (Intercity Notte) Milan - Parma - Bolgona - Ancona - Pescara - Foggia - Bari - Brindisi - Lecce
Express services (Regionale Veloce) Piacenza - Parma - Reggio Emilia - Bologna - Rimini - Ancona
Express services (Regionale Veloce) Milan - Piacenza - Parma - Reggio Emilia - Bologna (- Rimini)
Regional services (Treno regionale) Parma - Reggio Emilia - Modena - Bologna
Regional services (Treno regionale) Brescia - Ghedi - Asola - Piadena - Casalmaggiore - Parma
Regional services (Treno regionale) Genoa - La Spezia - Aulla - Pontremoli - Fornovo - Parma
Local services (Treno regionale) Parma - Guastalla - Suzzara

Passenger and train movements
The station has about 8 million passenger movements each year.

Many passenger trains call at the station platforms.  They include regional, express, InterCity, Frecciabianca services, and a daily pair of Frecciarossa high speed trains.

The main destinations of the regional trains are Milan, Bologna, La Spezia, Pontremoli and Brescia.

Interchange
The station provides interchange with the Parma trolleybus system, and with urban and suburban buses.

See also

 History of rail transport in Italy
 List of railway stations in Emilia-Romagna
 Rail transport in Italy
 Railway stations in Italy

References

External links

This article is based upon a translation of the Italian language version as at April 2011.

Railway station
Railway stations in Emilia-Romagna
Railway stations opened in 1859